Rhythm in Mind is an album by saxophonist Steve Coleman, recorded in 1991 and released by Novus Records.

Reception
The Toronto Star wrote that "the fluid emotional work of altoist Coleman headlines an octet gathering of post-bop conservatism, spacey odysseys and booting contributions from veterans Von Freeman on tenor and Tommy Flanagan on piano."

Scott Yanow of AllMusic stated: "The music is essentially a quirky version of straight-ahead jazz with generally strong solos from the diverse players, hints of Coleman's M-Base music, and some blues. Intriguing but not essential."

Track listing
All compositions by Steve Coleman except as indicated
 "Slipped Again" (Thad Jones) - 6:50  
 "Left of Center" - 8:16  
 "Sweet Dawn" - 8:00  
 "Pass It On" (Dave Holland) - 8:05  
 "Vet Blues" - 10:20  
 "Zec" (Thad Jones) - 9:06  
 "Afterthoughts" (Kevin Eubanks) - 6:28

Personnel
 Steve Coleman – alto saxophone
 Von Freeman – tenor saxophone
 Kenny Wheeler – trumpet, flugelhorn
 Kevin Eubanks – guitar
 Tommy Flanagan – piano
 Dave Holland – double bass
 Ed Blackwell – drums
 Marvin Smith – drums, percussion

References 

1992 albums
Steve Coleman albums
Novus Records albums